Justin Francis Rigali (born April 19, 1935) is an American cardinal of the Roman Catholic Church. He was the eighth Archbishop of Philadelphia, having previously served as Archbishop of St. Louis from 1994 to 2003, and was elevated to the cardinalate in 2003. Following a sex abuse probe into the Catholic Church, Cardinal Rigali resigned in 2010.

Rigali previously served as the Committee for Pro-Life Activities chairman of the United States Conference of Catholic Bishops.

Early life and education
The youngest of seven children, Justin Rigali was born on April 19, 1935, in Los Angeles, California, to Henry Alphonsus and Frances Irene (née White) Rigali. Two of his siblings entered the religious life as well; his sister Charlotte joined the Sisters of St. Joseph, and his brother Norbert the Jesuits. Rigali attended Holy Cross School before entering the preparatory seminary in Hancock Park, Los Angeles, in 1949. He studied philosophy and theology at Los Angeles College, Our Lady Queen of Angels Seminary in San Fernando, California, and St. John's Seminary in Camarillo, California. 

Rigali was ordained to the priesthood for the Archdiocese of Los Angeles by Cardinal James McIntyre on April 25, 1961, and then did pastoral work in Los Angeles and Downey, California.

In 1961, Rigali earned a Bachelor of Sacred Theology degree from the Catholic University of America in Washington, D.C.  In October 1961, he entered the graduate division of the Pontifical North American College in Rome, obtaining a Doctor of Canon Law degree from the Pontifical Gregorian University in 1964. He also served as an assistant during the first two sessions (1962–1963) of the Second Vatican Council in Rome. Rigali returned to California in the summer of 1964, serving as an associate pastor at a parish in Pomona. Back to Rome, he studied at the Pontifical Ecclesiastical Academy from 1964 to 1966 in preparation for his diplomatic work for the Vatican.

Priestly ministry

Rigali began his service in the English section of the Secretariat of State on November 25, 1964. From September 1966 to February 1970, he was secretary of the Apostolic Nunciature to Madagascar, which also served as the apostolic delegation for the islands of Réunion and Mauritius in the Indian Ocean. He was named a papal chamberlain by the Vatican on July 11, 1967. On February 11, 1970, Rigali became director of the English section of the Secretariat of State and the English translator to Pope Paul VI, whom Rigali subsequently accompanied on several international trips.

During his service at the Secretariat of State, Rigali was also a chaplain at a Carmelite monastery and a professor at the Pontifical Ecclesiastical Academy. He accompanied Pope John Paul II on several international pastoral visits, including his first two journeys to the United States in 1979 and 1987. Rigali was made a prelate of honor by the Vatican on April 19, 1980, and a magistral chaplain in the Order of the Knights of Malta on October 25, 1984.

Episcopal career
On June 8, 1985, Rigali was appointed president of the Pontifical Ecclesiastical Academy and titular archbishop of Volsinium by  John Paul II. He received his episcopal consecration on September 14, 1985, from John Paul II, with Cardinals Eduardo Somalo and Achille Silvestrini as co-consecrators, in the cathedral of Albano in Lazio, Italy Rigali selected as his episcopal motto: Verbum Caro Factum Est, meaning, "The Word Became Flesh". He became a member of the Order of the Holy Sepulchre on October 13, 1986.

From 1985 to 1990, in addition to his role of president of the Pontifical Ecclesiastical Academy, Rigali held a number of positions within the Roman Curia.  He served in the Secretariat of State, the Council for the Public Affairs of the Church, the Congregation for Bishops, and the Pontifical Council for the Laity. He was named secretary of the Congregation for Bishops by John Paul II on December 21, 1989; as secretary, he served as the second-highest official of that dicastery. Rigali was named secretary of the College of Cardinals by John Paul II on January 2, 1990, and served on the Permanent Interdicasterial Commission, Pontifical Commission for Latin America, and the Congregation for the Doctrine of the Faith. During the same time, he was also engaged in pastoral service to a number of parishes and seminaries in Rome.

Archbishop of St. Louis
On January 25, 1994, Pope John Paul II named Rigali as the seventh archbishop of the Archdiocese of St. Louis. Succeeding Archbishop  John L. May, Rigali was installed by Cardinal Bernardin Gantin on March 15, 1994. 

Rigalio became a member of the Knights of Columbus on November 7, 1994. During his tenure at St. Louis, Rigali showed a great interest in schools, visiting every high school in the archdiocese. However, Rigali opposed collective bargaining by teachers, and opposed any efforts they made to organize. Rigali was widely credited as an able administrator and effective fundraiser, although his popularity dimmed as his tenure continued.

In January 1999, Rigali hosted the pastoral visit of John Paul II to St. Louis, the only such papal visit to a single diocese in the United States during the pontificate. John Paul II reportedly decided to be hosted by the archdiocese because of his longtime close friendship with Rigali, from Rigali's days working under him in Rome as a bishop.

According to the St. Louis Business Journal, during his tenure as archbishop, Rigali "brought financial stability to the St. Louis Archdiocese, overseeing successful capital campaigns to address immediate needs and raising endowment funds for the future."

Archbishop of Philadelphia
Rigali was appointed the eighth archbishop of the Archdiocese of Philadelphia by  John Paul II on July 15, 2003, replacing the retiring Archbishop Anthony Bevilacqua. Prior to Rigali's installation in Philadelphia on October 7, 2003, it was announced on September 28 that he would be elevated to the College of Cardinals, a customary privilege for the archbishops of Philadelphia. Rigali was created cardinal-priest of Santa Prisca in the consistory of October 21, 2003.

Rigali was the only American cardinal to serve as a concelebrant at the 2005 funeral Mass for John Paul II. He was also one of the cardinal electors who participated in the ensuing papal conclave, which selected Pope Benedict XVI, as well as the following conclave, which selected Pope Francis. Rigali remained eligible to vote in conclaves until he reached 80 on April 19, 2015.

In September 2007, Rigali was named by Benedict XVI as a member of the Congregation for Bishops, the curia department that puts forward to the pope the names of those considered to be appropriate choices to be appointed as bishops.

Apostolic Administrator of Scranton
On August 31, 2009, Rigali became the apostolic administrator (sede vacante) to the Diocese of Scranton following the pope's acceptance of the resignations of Bishop Joseph Martino and Auxiliary Bishop John Dougherty. Rigali served eight months as the apostolic administrator.. His delegate was Joseph Bambera, who became the tenth Bishop of Scranton on April 26, 2010, bringing Rigali's administration of Scranton to an end.

Between Scranton administration and retirement
On June 16, 2011, Rigali was appointed the pope's special envoy to the celebrations at Prachatice in the Czech Republic for the 200th anniversary of the birth of John Neumann, the fourth bishop of Philadelphia. Neumann was the second American citizen to be canonized.

On July 19, 2011, Benedict XVI named Archbishop Charles J. Chaput to succeed Rigali in Philadelphia. Rigali's retirement occurred amid scandal, and specifically "amid an uproar over grand jury allegations that he was keeping about three dozen suspected abusers in ministry." Rigali initially had stated that "there were no priests in active ministry who had been accused of abuse" before reversing course and suspending 21 priests in a single day, "prompting criticism that he should have alerted prosecutors sooner." Chaput was installed on September 8, 2011.

Retirement
After the installation of Chaput in Philadelphia, Rigali retired in residence with the Diocese of Knoxville at the invitation of Bishop Richard Stika, who had been vicar general and chancellor of the Archdiocese of St. Louis when Rigali was archbishop there. He has been active in the diocese during his residence there. In December 2013, when Pope Francis overhauled the membership of the Congregation for Bishops, Rigali, then 78, retired and was not reappointed.

At least since November 2015, Rigali has also participated in some activities in the Diocese of Nashville.

Controversies over handling of sexual abuse scandals

As Rigali retired, The New York Times ran an article with the headline "In Philadelphia, a Changing of the Guard in the Shadow of Scandal"; the article referred to "the cloud that hangs over Cardinal Rigali's legacy – his mishandling of the abuse scandal." In September 2015, the group Catholic Whistleblowers, an organization of priests, nuns and canon lawyers who advocate on behalf of victims of clergy sex abuse, petitioned Pope Francis, shortly before his visit to the United States, to investigate Rigali's treatment of child sex abuse victims and families, along with the record of Cardinal Raymond Leo Burke.

In 2007, a former Catholic high school student called a church sexual abuse hotline to report that he had been repeatedly molested by Michael J. Bransfield—then a teacher at Lansdale Catholic High School in Pennsylvania—in the 1970s, decades before Bransfield had risen to become  Bishop of Wheeling-Charleston, West Virginia. Rigali, as archbishop of Philadelphia, handled the complaint, and in October 2009, Rigali declared the allegations to be unsubstantiated and took no action against Bransfield. At the time, Bransfield maintained friendly relations with members of the Church hierarchy in Philadelphia, giving Rigali a gift of $1,000 in 2011 and other cash gifts to other senior clerics of the Philadelphia archdiocese, including Monsignor Timothy C. Senior, the vicar for clergy. Bransfield was later forced out as bishop of Wheeling-Charleston in 2018, as he came under scrutiny for a series of allegations of sexual abuse and financial impropriety throughout his tenure. Bransfield's accuser said that Rigali and other officials "looked the other way" and failed to inform him about the church's handling of his complaint.

Views

Gay marriage
In June 2006, Rigali traveled to the White House along with Archbishop John J. Myers of Newark and Cardinal Seán Patrick O'Malley of Boston to attend a press conference by US President George W. Bush to support a constitutional amendment initiative in the United States Senate banning gay unions or marriages.

Abortion
As chairman of the United States Conference of Catholic Bishops' Pro-Life Committee, he remarked during the annual Washington, DC, Pro life rally in January 2007 that "there are reasons for rejoicing" in the pro-life cause: the growing participation by young people and a heightened awareness of the issue's intense and growing moral sensitivity among them, who will eventually have a contribution to make to societal issues. He has publicly endorsed the Pregnant Women Support Act, which he praised for offering "an authentic common ground" that "will proved many kinds of life-affirming support for pregnant women and their unborn children."

Conscience rights
In November 2009, Rigali, with several other Roman Catholic prelates, signed an ecumenical statement known as the Manhattan Declaration, which stated:
Because the sanctity of human life, the dignity of marriage as a union of husband and wife and the freedom of conscience and religion are foundational principles of justice and the common good, we are compelled by our Christian faith to speak and act in their defense. In this declaration we affirm: (1) the profound, inherent, and equal dignity of every human being as a creature fashioned in the very image of God, possessing inherent rights of equal dignity and life; (2) marriage as a conjugal union of man and woman, ordained by God from the creation, and historically understood by believers and non-believers alike, to be the most basic institution in society and; (3) religious liberty, which is grounded in the character of God, the example of Christ, and the inherent freedom and dignity of human beings created in the divine image ...

We are Christians who have joined together across historic lines of ecclesial differences to affirm our right—and, more importantly, to embrace our obligation—to speak and act in defense of these truths. We pledge to each other, and to our fellow believers, that no power on earth, be it cultural or political, will intimidate us into silence or acquiescence ...

Through the centuries, Christianity has taught that civil disobedience is not only permitted, but sometimes required. There is no more eloquent defense of the rights and duties of religious conscience than the one offered by Martin Luther King Jr., in his Letter from a Birmingham Jail. Writing from an explicitly Christian perspective, and citing Christian writers such as Augustine [of Hippo] and [Thomas] Aquinas, King taught that just laws elevate and ennoble human beings because they are rooted in the moral law whose ultimate source is God Himself.

Stem cell research
In March 2009, he described President Barack Obama's lifting of George W. Bush's restrictions on embryonic stem cell research as "a sad victory of politics over science and ethics."

Ordination of women
In April 2009, he denounced the ordination ceremony of two women in Roxborough, calling it a "pseudo-ordination" that "denigrates the truth entrusted to the Church by Christ himself."

Communications
He has a weekly series of Lenten discourses on YouTube. In the beginning of 2010 an official Facebook page was launched for Rigali.

Charity work
He is an honorary council member of the St. Louis, Missouri–based humanitarian organization Wings of Hope.

See also
 Catholic Church in the United States
 Historical list of the Catholic bishops of the United States

References

External links

 PodBean: Cardinal Justin Rigali - Podcast
 Roman Catholic Diocese of Knoxville: Office of Cardinal Rigali
 Roman Catholic Diocese of Knoxville: Tag Archive: Cardinal Justin Rigali 
 

 

1935 births
Living people
21st-century American cardinals
Diplomats of the Holy See
People from Los Angeles
Roman Catholic archbishops of Philadelphia
American people of Italian descent
Roman Catholic archbishops of St. Louis
Catholic University of America alumni
Pontifical Ecclesiastical Academy alumni
Pontifical Gregorian University alumni
Members of the Congregation for Bishops
Members of the Congregation for Divine Worship and the Discipline of the Sacraments
Cardinals created by Pope John Paul II
Pontifical North American College alumni
Presidents of the Pontifical Ecclesiastical Academy
Members of the Order of the Holy Sepulchre
Catholics from California